Harri Ilkka (born 23 August 1970) is a Finnish speed skater. He competed in two events at the 1992 Winter Olympics.

References

External links
 

1970 births
Living people
Finnish male speed skaters
Olympic speed skaters of Finland
Speed skaters at the 1992 Winter Olympics
People from Lapua
Sportspeople from South Ostrobothnia